Babubhai V. Shah (born 6 February 1935), professor of statistics, was a chief scientist at Research Triangle Institute (RTI) from 1966 till he retired in 2003. He held several positions with RTI and Research Triangle Park for over four decades. B. V. Shah was responsible for the development of the SUDAAN software; to recognize his contributions, RTI has dedicated the current release of SUDAAN (9.0) to B. V. Shah. During that time, he was also part of the academia of biostatistics department, University of North Carolina at Chapel Hill, N.C.

Shah received his Ph.D. in statistics from University of Mumbai in 1960 under the guidance of professor M. C. Chakrabarti.

Honors

 American Statistical Association, Fellow
 International Statistical Institute, Fellow
 Royal Statistical Society, Fellow

Selected peer-reviewed publications
 1958, On balancing in factorial experiments.  Annals of Mathematical Statistics 29: 766–779.
 1969. A note on predicting failures in a future time period.  The Institute of Electrical and Electronics Engineers Transactions on Reliability, p. 203-204.
 1979. Language design for survey data analysis. Bulletin of the International Statistical Institute, p. 273-292.
 (with R.W. Haley), 1981. Nosocomial infections in U.S. Hospitals, 1975–1976: estimated frequency by selected characteristics of patients. The American Journal of Medicine 70: 947–959

Books and book chapters
 Myers, L.E., N. Adams, L. Kier, T.K. Rao, B. Shah, and L. Williams (1991).  Microcomputer Software for Data Management and Statistical Analysis of the Ames/Salmonella Test.  In Krewski, D. and C. Franklin (Eds.), Statistics in Toxicology.  New York:  Gordon and Breach Science Publishers, pp. 265–279.
 LaVange, L.M., B.V. Shah, B.G. Barnwell, and J.F. Killinger (1990).  SUDAAN:  A comprehensive package for survey data analysis.  In G.E. Liepins and V.R.R. Uppuluri (Eds.),  Data Quality Control.  New York:  Marcell Dekker, Inc., pp. 209–227.
 Shah, B.V. and R.P. Moore (1977).  National Longitudinal Study of the High School Class of 1972:  Sample Design Efficiency Study—Effects of Stratification, Clustering, and Unequal Weighting on the Variances of NLS Statistics.  National Center for Education Statistics.  Sponsored Reports Series, Stock No. 017-080-01692-3, GPO.
 Shah, B.V. (1974).  On Mathematics of Population Simulation Models.  In B. Dyke and J.W. MacCluer (Eds.), Computer Simulation in Human Population Studies.  New York:  Academic Press, Inc., pp. 421–434.
 Shah, B.V., A.V. Rao, Q.W. Lindsey, R.C. Bhavsar, D.G. Horvitz, and J.R. Batts (1974).  The Evaluation of Four Alternative Family Planning Programs for Poland, a Less Developed Country.  In B. Dyke and J.W. MacCluer (Eds.), Computer Simulation in Human Population Studies.  New York:  Academic Press, Inc., pp. 261–304.
 Shah, B.V., D.G. Horvitz, P.A. Lachenbruch, and F.G. Giesbrecht (1971).  POPSIM, A Demographic Microsimulation Model.  Carolina Population Center, University of North Carolina at Chapel Hill, Monograph Series 12, pp. 45–68.

References

 

1935 births
Living people
Indian statisticians
University of Mumbai alumni
University of North Carolina at Chapel Hill faculty
Fellows of the American Statistical Association
20th-century Indian mathematicians